Revelation Records was an American jazz record label based in Los Angeles, active from 1965 until the late 1980s.

Revelation was founded by Occidental College professor and then-director of the Moore Laboratory of Zoology, John William (Bill) Hardy and UCLA employee Jon Horwich. The label was initially operated out of Los Angeles and then Glendale, California. Hardy had previously written liner notes for Dick Bock's productions for Pacific Jazz Records. Toward the end of the 1970s, the label's base of operations shifted to Gainesville, Florida. The label released approximately 50 albums.

Artists

Joe Albany
Bobby Bradford
Vera Brasil
Alan Broadbent
Dennis Budimir
Charlie Bush
John Carter
Jerry Coker
Clare Fischer
Gary Foster
Ronnie Hoopes
Mark Isham
Carmell Jones
Warne Marsh
Paul Nash
Anthony "Tony" Ortega
Jack Reilly
Putter Smith
Frank Strazzeri
Frank Sullivan

Discography

References

American record labels
Jazz record labels
Record labels established in 1965